Tekiath Ben Yessouf (born 13 September 1991) is an Nigerien taekwondo competitor. She represented Niger at the 2020 Summer Olympics held in Tokyo, Japan.

Career 

She competed in the women's lightweight event at the 2017 World Taekwondo Championships held in Muju, South Korea. She was eliminated in her second match. At the 2018 African Taekwondo Championships held in Agadir, Morocco, she won the silver medal in the women's 57 kg event.

In 2019, she competed in the women's featherweight event at the 2019 World Taekwondo Championships without winning a medal. In that same year, she also represented Niger at the 2019 African Games held in Rabat, Morocco and she won one of the bronze medals in the women's 57 kg event. In February 2020, she qualified at the 2020 African Taekwondo Olympic Qualification Tournament to compete at the 2020 Summer Olympics in Tokyo, Japan.

At the 2021 African Taekwondo Championships held in Dakar, Senegal, she won the gold medal in the women's 57 kg event. A few months later, she lost her bronze medal match in the women's 57 kg event at the 2020 Summer Olympics held in Tokyo, Japan.

Achievements

References

External links 
 

Living people
1991 births
People from Niamey
Nigerien female taekwondo practitioners
African Taekwondo Championships medalists
African Games medalists in taekwondo
African Games bronze medalists for Niger
Competitors at the 2019 African Games
Taekwondo practitioners at the 2020 Summer Olympics
Olympic taekwondo practitioners of Niger
21st-century Nigerien people